The 1997 Australian Open was a tennis tournament played on outdoor hard courts at Melbourne Park in Melbourne in Victoria in Australia. It was the 85th edition of the Australian Open and was held from 13 through 26 January 1997.

Prior to the 2021 US Open, this was the last Grand Slam tournament not to feature Roger Federer, Rafael Nadal, Serena Williams, or Venus Williams in the main singles draw.

Seniors

Men's singles

 Pete Sampras defeated  Carlos Moyá 6–2, 6–3, 6–3
 It was Sampras' 9th career Grand Slam title and his 2nd and last Australian Open title.

Women's singles

 Martina Hingis defeated  Mary Pierce 6–2, 6–2
 It was Hingis' 1st career Grand Slam title and her 1st Australian Open title. Hingis became the first Swiss player – male or female – to win a Grand Slam singles title.

Men's doubles

 Todd Woodbridge /  Mark Woodforde defeated  Sébastien Lareau /  Alex O'Brien 4–6, 7–5, 7–5, 6–3
 It was Woodbridge's 13th career Grand Slam title and his 3rd Australian Open title. It was Woodforde's 14th career Grand Slam title and his 4th and last Australian Open title.

Women's doubles

 Martina Hingis /  Natasha Zvereva defeated  Lindsay Davenport /  Lisa Raymond 6–2, 6–2
 It was Hingis' 3rd career Grand Slam title and her 2nd Australian Open title. It was Zvereva's 18th career Grand Slam title and her 5th and last Australian Open title.

Mixed doubles

 Manon Bollegraf /  Rick Leach defeated  Larisa Neiland /  John-Laffnie de Jager 6–3, 6–7(5–7), 7–5
 It was Bollegraf's 3rd career Grand Slam title and her only Australian Open title. It was Leach's 7th career Grand Slam title and his 4th Australian Open title.

Juniors

Boys' singles
 Daniel Elsner defeated  Wesley Whitehouse 7–6, 6–2

Girls' singles
 Mirjana Lučić defeated  Marlene Weingärtner 6–2, 6–2

Boys' doubles
 David Sherwood /  James Trotman defeated  Jaco van der Westhuizen /  Wesley Whitehouse 7–6, 6–3

Girls' doubles
 Mirjana Lučić /  Jasmin Wöhr defeated  Cho Yoon-jeong /  Shiho Hisamatsu 6–2, 6–2

Other events

Legends' doubles
 Peter McNamara /  Fred Stolle defeated  Mark Edmondson /  Ken Rosewall 6–4, 6–4

External links
 Australian Open official website

 
 

 
1997 in Australian tennis
January 1997 sports events in Australia
1997,Australian Open